Ross Thomas may refer to:
Ross Thomas (author) (1926–1995), American writer of crime fiction
Ross Thomas (actor) (born 1981), American actor, filmmaker, philanthropist and adventurer
Ross Thomas (archaeologist) (died 2022), British archaeologist

See also